Tiu Tang Lung (Chinese: 吊燈籠) is a hill within Plover Cove Country Park in northeastern Hong Kong. The hill is reasonably hard for hikers and should only be attempted in good weather with correct equipment.

See also
 List of mountains, peaks and hills in Hong Kong

References